Filigranology is the study of watermarks. It is usually pursued in order to discover information about the date and origin for a paper-based piece of writing or a piece of art. There are several catalogues of watermarks - most notably C. M. Briquet's, Les Filigranes (1907) - including illustrations of many watermarks from dated documents to aid those wishing to undertake this kind of research.

References

Watermarking
Papermaking
Paper